Kevin Sorensen (born 10 May 1981) is an Irish former professional tennis player.

Born and raised in Germany, Sorensen was an Irish passport holder through his father Sean Sorensen, a former tour player. His mother Helga is German. He chose to represent Ireland and in 2004 became the Irish No.1.

From 2004 and 2007 he was a member of Ireland's Davis Cup team, which also included his younger brother Louk and was captained by their father. During his Davis Cup career he won seven singles and five doubles rubbers. In 2005 he took a set off Marcos Baghdatis in Dublin.

Sorensen attained a best singles world ranking of 353, winning two ITF Futures titles. En route to his second title, in Cremona in 2005, he had a win over Andy Murray.

ITF Futures titles

Singles: (2)

Doubles: (1)

See also
List of Ireland Davis Cup team representatives

References

External links
 
 
 

1981 births
Living people
Irish male tennis players
Irish people of German descent
People from Schwäbisch Hall
Sportspeople from Stuttgart (region)